The Wheego LiFe was an early-2010s limited-production all-electric city car developed by American automobile manufacturer Wheego Technologies from the bodyshell of the Chinese-made Shuanghuan Noble. The Wheego LiFe was unveiled at the 2010 Los Angeles Auto Show and was sold in the United States at a price of US$32,995 before any applicable tax credits and other incentives.

The first delivery took place in April 2011 to a customer in Atlanta. A total of approximately 300 whips and 100 LiFes were sold through 2013, when production ceased.

History

Wheego Electric Cars Inc. was formed as a spin out from RTEV (Ruff & Tuff Electric Vehicles) in June 2009 and its first automobile was a two-seat compact car under the Wheego Whip name in North America and marketed by Shuanghuan Auto in China as the E-Noble, its brand name for the rest of the world.

Production and sales

The chassis was the same as the Shuanghuan Noble, which once imported from China was reinforced for safety in the U.S. assembly plant to pass U.S. crash-testing. Final assembly took place in Corona, California. Around 73% of the vehicle was composed of American products giving it a high domestic content rating.

The first Wheego LiFe was delivered to a customer in Atlanta, Georgia on April 22 (Earth Day), 2011. As of March 2012, the company had manufactured 36 cars since April 2011, and only two cars were left in inventory. Wheego's business strategy was to build the cars only when the company gets money from sales or through venture capital. About 400 units were sold through 2013, when production ended.

Specifications

The 2011 Wheego LiFe had the following specifications:

 Battery: 30 kWh (36 3.2 V cells at 260 Ah) lithium iron phosphate battery pack.
 Motor: Nominal , peak horsepower 
 Range: 
 Torque: 95 lb⋅ft (129 N⋅m)
 Charge capable: 120 V and 240 V
 Charging time: From 50% SoC to 100% Soc 5 hours with Level 2 charging system
 On-board charge port: J1772 compliant
 Top speed:  at 8,500 rpm

References

Further reading
 Wirth, Michelle. "Reporter". WABE/PBA. publicbroadcasting.net.
 Woodyard, Chris (2011-04-22). "Atlanta couple buys first Wheego electric car". USA Today. USA Today.
 Jim Motavalli (2012-03-14). "Can The Tiny Wheego Win The Electric Car Race?". Forbes.

Production electric cars
Vehicles introduced in 2011
2010s cars